The molluscs have the widest variety of eye morphologies of any phylum, and a large degree of variation in their function. Cephalopods such as octopus, squid, and cuttlefish have eyes as complex as those of vertebrates, while scallops have up to 100 simple eyes.

Diversity
There are between seven and eleven distinct eye types in molluscs. Molluscs have eyes of all levels of complexity, from the pit eyes of many gastropods, to the pinhole eyes of the Nautilus, to the lensed eyes of the other cephalopods. Compound eyes are present in some bivalves, and reflective 'mirrors' have been innovated by other lineages such as scallops.

Anatomy
Gastropods and cephalopods have paired eyes on their heads (and sometimes tails), but many molluscs do not have clear head regions in which to locate the eyes. Consequently, many molluscs may have a multitude of eyes in more unlikely places, such as along the edge of their shell. Chitons have a dispersed network of tiny eyes over the surface of their shells which may act together as a compound eye.
Many gastropods have stalked eyes; the eye can be retracted into the stalk itself in the presence of danger.

See also 
 Arthropod eye
 Parietal eye
 Sensory organs of gastropods
 Simple eye in invertebrates
 Vision in fish
 Visual system

References

External links

Eye
Vision by taxon
eye